Israir Airlines Ltd., more commonly referred to as Israir, is an Israeli airline headquartered in Tel Aviv. It operates domestic scheduled and air taxi flights from Ben Gurion International Airport, Ramon Airport, and Haifa Airport as well as international charter services from Ben Gurion International Airport to Europe and Asia. It also operates VIP flights, and is Israel's second-largest airline after El Al, surpassing Arkia Israel Airlines during the Coronavirus pandemic, employing some 350 staff.

History

Foundation and early years
Israir Airlines was established in 1989 as Kanfei HaEmek (Valley Wings) before changing its name to Israir Airlines in 1996. It is now wholly owned by the Ganden Group. The airline began with domestic services from Eilat Airport, Ben Gurion International Airport, Sde Dov Airport, and Haifa Airport in the north of the country. It expanded its operations to begin international charter flights in 1999, building up a route network that now covers much of Europe, as well as regularly flying to other destinations in Asia, Africa, and North America. The airline is said to have modeled itself on US low-cost carrier JetBlue.

The airline expanded operations across the Atlantic Ocean when regular charter service to New York City's John F. Kennedy International Airport was started in June 2004. Permission was granted to the airline to convert this to regular scheduled service by the Israeli government and the FAA on May 1, 2006. This service was discontinued in September 2008, due to escalating fuel prices and the expectation of a drop in the number of passengers due to the weakness of the dollar at the time. After Israir was granted permission to operate scheduled service on the lucrative New York-Tel Aviv route, it also entered talks with both Boeing and Airbus regarding the acquisition of new aircraft to its fleet and replacement of its existing jets. The company was said to be in talks with Airbus over the A350 model. It also signed a deal to acquire Airbus A320 aircraft. This was a significant milestone in Israeli aviation, as no airline had ever before purchased Airbus aircraft. In April 2008, the airline received an Airbus A330 for its New York flights to replace the Boeing 767 aircraft it had previously been wet-leasing. Israir however meanwhile no longer flies to New York and has since phased out all long-haul aircraft.

In early 2007, the airline announced plans to introduce Sky-Torah scrolls on each of its aircraft. These were effectively Torah scrolls which would be carried on board its flight for Jewish passengers to use for prayer. This is a first for any Israeli airline and was seen by many as a means to attract many Haredi passengers to the airline at a time when they were showing great dissatisfaction with arch-rival, El Al, following their flying of aircraft on the Shabbat. Later on in 2007, an Israir passenger announced he was filing a lawsuit against the airline for misadvertising the legroom they offered on their aircraft.

In early 2008, when restrictions were lifted on Israeli airlines' destinations, Israir applied for designated carrier status on routes from Israel to London, Paris, Berlin, Moscow, Amsterdam, Rome, Budapest, Las Vegas, and Miami – some of which were destinations served by the airline as charter routes back then.

Developments since 2010
Israir received the first of the two ATR 72 aircraft it had on order in early July 2011 to replace the ATR 42, with the second one expected to follow later that month.

In 2014, the airline posted losses of 18.4 million shekel. On 25 May 2015, an Israir Airbus A320-200 has been seized by Portuguese authorities while in Lisbon over unpaid debts to Portuguese euroAtlantic Airways for a leasing contract in 2008.

Also in May 2015, El Al confirmed to be in talks to merge its subsidiary Sun D'Or into Israir Airlines. While Sun D'Or would be dissolved, El Al would gain shares in Israir instead.

In October 2020, it was announced that the company is being auctioned off, the bids need to be submitted by November 8. On October 4, the first bid was submitted by Rami Levy and Shalom Haim through BGI Investments. On October 13, Dubai-based NY Koen Group, headed by Naum Koen, has announced its intention to participate in the auction.

Destinations

Fleet 
The Israir fleet consists of the following aircraft (as of February 2023):

Incidents and accidents 
 In June 2001, one of Israir's ATR 42-320 aircraft was damaged beyond repair following a heavy landing at Ben Gurion Airport. Despite the aircraft being written off, no passengers were injured in this incident.
 On July 6, 2005 a fully loaded Israir 767 accidentally taxied onto an active runway at JFK, and a Douglas DC-8 cargo aircraft narrowly avoided collision by taking off at full throttle above them, with only 45 feet of clearance over the 767.
 In May 2007, an Israir Airlines aircraft on a test flight was almost shot down by Israeli F-16 jets after it entered a demarcation zone where airlines are expected to identify themselves.
 Later that month, on May 23, an Israir flight had to make an emergency landing following smoke build up in the cabin on approach at Berlin-Schönefeld International Airport. No one was injured in the incident.
 In July 2008, an Israir Airlines aircraft flew from Eilat Airport to Ben Gurion International Airport with a small hole in its frame. The hole was discovered by mechanics at Ben Gurion and there is an ongoing probe as to whether or not Israir knew of the hole, which, as it turns out, was caused by Israir workers in Eilat when they crashed a mobile staircase into the aircraft's body. The plane was scheduled to fly to Italy from Tel Aviv, and at an altitude of over 10,000 meters, the plane would most likely have experienced a decompression.

References

External links 

 

Companies based in Tel Aviv
Airlines established in 1996
Airlines established in 1989
Airlines of Israel
Israeli brands
Israeli companies established in 1989
Israeli companies established in 1996